Two Loves is a 1961 American drama film.

Two Loves may also refer to:

Film 
 Two Loves (1912 film), a short film directed by Gaston Méliès
 Les deux amours, a 1917 French film directed by Charles Burguet and released in English as Two Loves
 Deux amors, a 1949 French comedy film directed by Richard Pottier and released in English as Two Loves

Music 
 Two Loves (album), a 1973 album by pianist Duke Jordan
 "Two Loves", a 1968 single by Sean Dunphy & The Hoedowners
 "Two Loves/Never Again", a 1969 single by the American vocal group The Cheers

Other uses
Two Loves, an 1892 poem by Lord Alfred Douglas ending "the Love that dare not speak its name"
 Moya Prechistenka, or Two Loves, a 2006 Russian TV pilot directed by Boris Tokarev

See also 
 My Two Loves
 Two Lovers (disambiguation)